The first season of Pretty Little Liars, based on the books of the same name by Sara Shepard, premiered on June 8, 2010 and concluded on March 21, 2011 on ABC Family.

The show premiered to 2.47 million viewers and retained a regular audience of 2.5 million viewers during its summer run. The summer finale scored 3.07 million viewers, achieving a series high. The show went on hiatus and returned with its winter premiere on January 3, 2011, with 4.20 million viewers, becoming one of ABC Family's top telecasts to date.

Overview
Set in the fictional town of Rosewood, Pennsylvania,  Spencer Hastings, Aria Montgomery, Hanna Marin, Emily Fields, and Alison DiLaurentis' lives are irrevocably changed after their clique leader Alison "Ali" goes missing during a sleepover. The four remaining girls forever believe their secrets are safe for all time, but the absence of one of their leaders makes them drift apart. One year later, the former group of friends are forced to reunite after their once-missing friend is discovered dead, and they begin receiving threatening texts from someone named "A," who utilizes secrets that only their dead friend would know to terrorize them. Knowing that if their secrets are out, it will jeopardize them and their futures, the girls decide to team up and figure out who is behind the mask.

Cast

Main 
 Troian Bellisario as Spencer Hastings 
 Ashley Benson as Hanna Marin 
 Holly Marie Combs as Ella Montgomery 
 Lucy Hale as Aria Montgomery 
 Ian Harding as Ezra Fitz 
 Bianca Lawson as Maya St. Germain
 Laura Leighton as Ashley Marin
 Chad Lowe as Byron Montgomery
 Shay Mitchell as Emily Fields
 Nia Peeples as Pam Fields
 Sasha Pieterse as Alison DiLaurentis

Recurring 
 Keegan Allen as Toby Cavanaugh
 Tammin Sursok as Jenna Marshall
 Janel Parrish as Mona Vanderwaal
 Torrey DeVitto as Melissa Hastings
 Ryan Merriman as Ian Thomas
 Chuck Hittinger as Sean Ackard
 Tyler Blackburn as Caleb Rivers
 Brendan Robinson as Lucas Gottesman
 Brant Daugherty as Noel Kahn
 Lesley Fera as Veronica Hastings
 Cody Allen Christian as Mike Montgomery
 Lindsey Shaw as Paige McCullers
 Bryce Johnson as Darren Wilden
 Diego Boneta as Alex Santiago

Guest 
 Julian Morris as Wren Kingston
 Nolan North as Peter Hastings
 Jim Titus as Officer Barry Maple
 Yani Gellman as Garrett Reynolds
 Eric Steinberg as Wayne Fields
 Jill Holden as Mrs. Welch
 Amanda Schull as Meredith Sorenson
 Carlson Young as Amber Victorino
 Parker Bagley as Jason DiLaurentis
 Andrea Parker as Jessica DiLaurentis
 Roark Critchlow as Tom Marin
 Tilky Jones as Logan Reed
 Patrick J. Adams as Hardy
 Sara Shepard as Ms. Shepard
 2AM Club as themselves

Notes

Episodes

Development and production
Originally developed as a television series by book packaging company Alloy Entertainment, the idea was described as "Desperate Housewives for teens." Alloy met with author Shepard, and gave her the property to develop into a book series. With Alloy and Warner Horizon interested in producing a Pretty Little Liars television series for years, it was first planned for The WB in 2005 with a different writer. The first novel was published by HarperTeen in October 2006. In June 2008, Alloy noted that it was developing a Pretty Little Liars television pilot for ABC Family. The novels are being adapted for television by I. Marlene King.

Casting
ABC Family began casting for a Pretty Little Liars television pilot in October 2009. Lucy Hale was cast as Aria Montgomery in the project, followed by Troian Bellisario and Ian Harding (as Spencer Hastings and Ezra Fitz, respectively) in November 2009. In December 2009 The Futon Critic confirmed the casting of Ashley Benson as Hanna Marin and Shay Mitchell as Emily Fields, as well as the addition of Laura Leighton as Ashley Marin, Alexis Denisof as Byron Montgomery, Bianca Lawson as Maya, as well as Jean Louisa Kelly and Nia Peeples. The Hollywood Reporter also noted that Torrey DeVitto and Sasha Pieterse landed recurring roles in the pilot.

The Alloy website later confirmed that Pieterse would be playing Alison DiLaurentis and DeVitto would be Melissa Hastings, also noting Janel Parrish as Mona Vanderwaal and Cody Allen Christian, as Mike Montgomery. In April 2010, Chad Lowe replaced Alexis Denisof as Aria's father, Byron Montgomery. Also in April, Holly Marie Combs was cast as Ella Montgomery.

Ratings

Live + SD ratings

DVD release

References

2010 American television seasons
2011 American television seasons
Pretty Little Liars (franchise)